This list is of the Historic Sites of Japan located within the Prefecture of Tokushima.

National Historic Sites
As of 1 July 2019, twelve Sites have been designated as being of national significance.

Prefectural Historic Sites
As of 1 April 2019, twenty-six Sites have been designated as being of prefectural importance.

Municipal Historic Sites
As of 1 May 2018, a further one hundred and thirty-three Sites have been designated as being of municipal importance.

See also
 Cultural Properties of Japan
 Awa Province
 Tokushima Prefectural Museum
 List of Places of Scenic Beauty of Japan (Tokushima)

References

Tokushima Prefecture
 Tokushima